Sponging may refer to:

Begging
Sponge diving
Tool use of sponges by bottlenose dolphins in Australia; see Cultural hitchhiking#In dolphins / Sponging (Cetacean Tool Use)